Ferdinand is a town in Ferdinand Township, Dubois County, in the U.S. state of Indiana. The population was 2,157 at the 2010 census.

Ferdinand is part of the Jasper Micropolitan Statistical Area.

History

Ferdinand was founded in 1840 by Fr. Joseph Kundek, OSB and was named after the Emperor Ferdinand I of Austria. The town was settled by mostly German-speaking people from central Europe. At one time Ferdinand was known as the wooden shoe village. At the end of the 19th century, Ferdinand contained many businesses, including a machine works, a brick works, brewery, several taverns, and a dairy.

The Ferdinand post office has been in operation since 1850.

In 1867, the Monastery of Immaculate Conception was founded in Ferdinand.

Ferdinand was incorporated as a town in 1905.

In 1906, the Ferdinand News was established as the local newspaper.

Just prior to World War II the Civilian Conservation Corps created the Ferdinand State Forest.

The Monastery Immaculate Conception and Dr. Alois Wollenmann House are listed on the National Register of Historic Places.

Geography
Ferdinand is located at  (38.225392, -86.860996).

Demographics

2010 census
As of the census of 2010, there were 2,157 people, 823 households, and 566 families residing in the town. The racial makeup of the town was 98.2% White, 0.1% African American, 0.2% Asian, 0.4% from other races, and 1.0% from two or more races. Hispanic or Latino of any race were 1.6% of the population.

There were 823 households, of which 30.9% had children under the age of 18 living with them, 55.9% were married couples living together, 9.1% had a female householder with no husband present, 3.8% had a male householder with no wife present, and 31.2% were non-families. 27.5% of all households were made up of individuals, and 14.8% had someone living alone who was 65 years of age or older. The average household size was 2.38 and the average family size was 2.89.

The median age in the town was 45.1 years. 21% of residents were under the age of 18; 6.2% were between the ages of 18 and 24; 22.6% were from 25 to 44; 25% were from 45 to 64; and 25.2% were 65 years of age or older. The gender makeup of the town was 44.5% male and 55.5% female.

2000 census
As of the census of 2000, there were 2,277 people, 808 households, and 569 families residing in the town. The racial makeup of the town was 99.03% White, 0.04% African American, 0.09% Native American, 0.18% Asian, 0.09% Pacific Islander, 0.31% from other races, and 0.26% from two or more races. Hispanic or Latino of any race were 0.61% of the population.

There were 808 households, out of which 35.3% had children under the age of 18 living with them, 60.9% were married couples living together, 7.7% had a female householder with no husband present, and 29.5% were non-families. 27.1% of all households were made up of individuals, and 14.0% had someone living alone who was 65 years of age or older. The average household size was 2.51 and the average family size was 3.09.

In the town, the population was spread out, with 24.8% under the age of 18, 5.7% from 18 to 24, 28.6% from 25 to 44, 20.9% from 45 to 64, and 20.1% who were 65 years of age or older. The median age was 39 years. For every 100 females, there were 78.9 males. For every 100 females age 18 and over, there were 74.3 males.

The median income for a household in the town was $41,326, and the median income for a family was $52,065. Males had a median income of $34,205 versus $23,646 for females. The per capita income for the town was $18,335. About 3.4% of families and 9.9% of the population were below the poverty line, including 4.2% of those under age 18 and 16.1% of those age 65 or over.

Attractions 
Attractions in Ferdinand include:
 Monastery Immaculate Conception, the monastery of The Sisters of St. Benedict of Ferdinand
 Ferdinand State Forest

Education 
 Forest Park Jr./Sr. High School
 Ferdinand Elementary School
 Cedar Crest Intermediate School

The town has a public library, a branch of the Jasper-Dubois County Public Library.

Churches 
 St. Ferdinand Catholic Church

References

External links
 Town of Ferdinand, Indiana, website
 Monastery Immaculate Conception
 Ferdinand State Forest

Towns in Dubois County, Indiana
Towns in Indiana
Communities of Southwestern Indiana
Jasper, Indiana micropolitan area
Populated places established in 1840
1840 establishments in Indiana